The Mayor of Oslo is the chief executive of the Oslo. The Mayor's office administers all city services, public property, most public agencies, and enforces all city and state laws within Oslo city.

List of mayors of oslo

This is a list of mayors of Oslo.

See also
 Timeline of Oslo

References 

Oslo